Copperopolis Congregational Church (also known as Copperopolis Community Center) is a historic church building at 411 Main Street in Copperopolis, California. The church was built in 1866 and designed in the Gothic Revival style; it is the only Gothic Revival building remaining in Copperopolis and one of two in Calaveras County. The brick church features a Gothic arch entrance and windows, a gable roof, and a bell tower. The church held Congregational services until it was leased to the Presbyterian Church; it became a Congregational church again in 1874 and remained so until 1895. In 1903, the Independent Order of Odd Fellows bought the church and converted it to a lodge hall. The Odd Fellows owned the church until 1939, when it became a community center.

The church was added to the National Register of Historic Places on December 30, 1997.

References

External links

Churches on the National Register of Historic Places in California
Gothic Revival church buildings in California
Churches completed in 1866
Buildings and structures in Calaveras County, California
1866 establishments in California
National Register of Historic Places in Calaveras County, California